E62 may refer to:
 European route E62
 King's Indian Defence, Encyclopaedia of Chess Openings code
 Fukagawa-Rumoi Expressway, route E62 in Japan

See also 
 Nokia E61